Prévost is a provincial electoral district in the Laurentides region of Quebec, Canada that elected members to the National Assembly of Quebec. It notably includes the municipality of Sainte-Sophie.

It was created for the 1973 election from parts of Montcalm and Terrebonne districts.  Its final election was in 2008.  It disappeared in the 2012 election and the successor electoral district was Saint-Jérôme.

As of its final election, it consisted of the municipalities of Prévost and Saint-Jérôme. In the change from the 2001 to the 2011 electoral map, the eponymous municipality of Prévost moved from the defunct Prévost electoral district to the Bertrand electoral district; the remaining municipality of Saint-Jérôme then became a separate new electoral district in its own right, named Saint-Jérôme.

The district was reconstituted for the 2018 election, with its territory consisting of the municipalities of Prévost, Sainte-Anne-des-Lacs, Sainte-Sophie, Saint-Hippolyte, Saint-Sauveur and Piedmont.

The riding was named after the Prévost family, a regional family in which several members were elected to the National Assembly.

Members of the National Assembly

Election results

Prévost, 2018–present

Prévost, 1973–2012

|-
 
|Liberal
|Jacques Gariepy
|align="right"|10,001
|align="right"|29.04
|align="right"| +9.56

|-

|-
|}

|-
 
|Liberal
|Richard Bélisle
|align="right"|7,929
|align="right"|19.48
|align="right"|

|-
|}

References

External links
Information
 Elections Quebec

Election results
 Election results (National Assembly)
 Election results (Elections Quebec)

Maps
 2001 map (Flash)
2001–2011 changes (Flash)
1992–2001 changes (Flash)
 Electoral map of Laurentides region (as of 2001)
 Quebec electoral map, 2001

Quebec provincial electoral districts